Ashawari is a 2022 Sri Lankan Sinhala romantic film directed and produced by Theja Iddamalgoda for Media Vision Films in his directorial debut. The film stars Hemal Ranasinghe and newcomer Ishatka Jahanvi in lead role whereas Saranga Disasekara, Jayani Senanayake and Bimal Jayakody made supportive roles. It is the last film acted by veteran dramatist Jayalath Manoratne.

Plot
The film revolves around Ranesh Singhawansha, a young man from a very wealthy family in the upcountry. While training at the Diyatalawa Military Academy, he started a love affair with the youngest daughter of the Ohiya Station Master called "Ashavari". The film flows with the conflict between the two families.

Cast
 Hemal Ranasinghe as Ranesh Singhawansha
 Ishanka Jahanvi as Ashawari
 Jayalath Manoratne as Station master, Ashawari's father
 Jayani Senanayake as Rajini Subramanium, Ashawari's mother
 Saranga Disasekara as Ranesh's father
 Semini Iddamalgoda as Ranesh's mother
 Bimal Jayakody as Lasantha
 Priyankara Rathnayake
 Daya Wayaman
 Dinithi Walgamage as Ashawari's sister, Lasantha's love interest 
 Lasantha Udukumbura as Lasantha's friend
 Ruvi Lakmali
 Danushka Dias
 Rohan Ranatunga

Production
The Muhurath ceremony of the film was held in 2018 and shooting commenced from October 2018. This is the directorial debut for Theja Iddamalgoda who is more popular in advertising design. The film features several songs sung by Nirosha Virajini, Surendra Perera, Sanka Dineth and Upeka Nirmani. Lyrics penned by Kelum Srimal and Nandana Wickramage. In the film, art direction done by Sunil Premaratne, costume design by Lasantha Udakumbura and makeup by Indika Udara. Daminda D. Madawala and Indunil Deraniyagala are the assistant directors. The film was shot in Diyatalawa, Ohiya, Idalgashinna, Nuwara Eliya, Ambewela areas and Ranminitenna drama village.

Release
The film was earlier set to be released in January 2022, but later confirmed to screen in theaters on March 3, 2022. Then the film is set to release in Canada, England, Australia, New Zealand and the United States in late March.

References

External links
 
 Official trailer
 ආශාවරී තිරගතවූ දා කී කතා

2022 films
2020s Sinhala-language films
2022 romantic drama films
Sri Lankan romantic drama films